Passer passer piger is a 1965 Danish comedy film directed by Sven Methling and starring Helle Virkner.

Cast

Helle Virkner as Fru Henriksen
Poul Reichhardt as Hr. Henriksen
Jan Priiskorn-Schmidt as Peter
Dirch Passer as Alf Thomsen
Hanne Borchsenius as Frk. Monalisa Jacobsen
Sigrid Horne-Rasmussen as Fru Hansen
Ove Sprogøe as Thorbjørn Hansen
Caja Heimann as Fru Feddersen
Karl Stegger as Hr. Feddersen
Beatrice Palner as Fru Svendsen
Henning Palner as Hr. Svendsen
Paul Hagen as Sælger
Carl Ottosen as Brandmajoren
Kirsten Passer as Bogsælger
Aino Korwa as Miss Harboøre
Karin Grubert as Miss Nørrebro
Marianne Jørgensen as Miss Lolland
Dianna Vangsaa as Miss Sengeløse
Marianne Tholsted as Miss Taasinge
Jeanne von d'Ahe as Miss Vojens
Bertel Lauring as Billetkontrollør

References

1965 films
1965 comedy films
1960s Danish-language films
Films directed by Sven Methling
Films scored by Sven Gyldmark
Danish comedy films